Greg Rusedski was the defending champion.  Rusedski successfully defended his title, beating Vincent Spadea in the final, 7–6(7–3), 2–6, 6–4.

Seeds

Draw

Finals

Top half

Bottom half

External links
 Main draw
 Qualifying draw

Campbell's Hall of Fame Tennis Championships - Singles